The 1971–72 NBA season was the 26th season of the National Basketball Association.  The season ended with the Los Angeles Lakers winning the NBA Championship, beating the New York Knicks 4 games to 1 in the NBA Finals.

As the 25th anniversary of the founding of the modern NBA, the league unveiled a new logo, inspired by the logo of Major League Baseball, to commemorate the occasion.  It features the white silhouette of a basketball player dribbling, framed by red and blue.  Jerry West of the Los Angeles Lakers was used as the model for the logo.  Coincidentally, Jerry West would win the only NBA Championship of his career during the season.

Notable occurrences
 The San Diego Rockets relocated to Houston, Texas and became the Houston Rockets.
 The San Francisco Warriors were renamed the Golden State Warriors and the team moved across the San Francisco Bay to Oakland.
 The 1972 NBA All-Star Game was played at the Forum in Inglewood, California, with the West beating the East 112–110. To the delight of the home crowd, Jerry West of the Lakers won the game's MVP award, making a basket at the buzzer to win the game.
 The Lakers' 69 wins set a new record for most regular season wins in NBA history. This mark would stand for 24 seasons, until it was bettered by the 1995–96 Chicago Bulls.
 The Lakers' Elgin Baylor announced his retirement nine games into the season. That night, the Lakers began a winning streak that would last for two months, totaling 33 games. That streak still stands as the longest winning streak in the history of major American professional team sports.
The current NBA logo, which features the silhouette of Jerry West, made its debut. The blue/red pattern was adopted from the Major League Baseball logo.
This was the first season the Syracuse Nationals/Philadelphia 76ers did not make the playoffs.
 This was the last season of the Cincinnati Royals. The team would relocate in the offseason, splitting their home games between Kansas City and Omaha, and rename themselves the Kings.

Regular season
The Los Angeles Lakers came into the season returning a veteran squad from their playoff run a year before.  Nine games into the season, aging and oft injured Elgin Baylor announced his retirement after 13 seasons. He was replaced at the starting small forward spot by Jim McMillian, who would go on to average 18 points per game, third best on the team.  Despite Baylor's retirement, the Lakers went on a 33-game winning streak.  The Lakers completed two undefeated months, going 14–0 in November and 16–0 in December. After winning their first three games in January, the Lakers lost 120–104 to the Milwaukee Bucks. On March 20, 1972, the Lakers beat Golden State by a record 63 points (162–99), a mark that would stand until 1991, when Cleveland beat Miami by 68 points (148–80) and later was broken in 2021 when Memphis beat Oklahoma City by 73 points (152–79).  The Lakers finished the season with a record 69 wins, which would stand until the 1995–96 season when the Chicago Bulls won 72 regular season games and later was also broken by the 2015–16 Golden State Warriors won an NBA record 73 regular season games.

The defending champion Milwaukee Bucks won 63 games on the play of renamed Kareem Abdul-Jabbar, formerly Lew Alcindor, and Oscar Robertson.  The Celtics, led by second year center Dave Cowens, point guard Jo Jo White and 32-year-old swingman John Havlicek won the Atlantic Division with 56 wins. Boston had recovered from the retirement of Bill Russell, K. C. Jones and Sam Jones by winning 12 more games than the previous season.

Playoffs
In the first round, the Lakers swept the Bulls and Milwaukee defeated Golden State. New York eliminated the Bullets and Boston won against the Atlanta Hawks. In the Western Conference Finals, the Lakers lost game 1 versus the defending champion Bucks at The Forum 93–72, a game that saw the Lakers score only 8 points in the third quarter. However, the Lakers led by assist champion Jerry West, leading scorer Gail Goodrich and veteran Wilt Chamberlain would win 4 of the next 5 games and beat Milwaukee in six games. In the Eastern Conference Finals, New York defeated the top-seed Celtics in five games.

In the NBA Finals, New York won game 1 very easily, but Los Angeles won game 2 106–92 to even the series. In game 3, the Lakers jumped out to a 22-point lead and regained home-court advantage with a 107–96 win. In game 4, the Knicks forced overtime. At the end of regulation, Wilt Chamberlain was called for his fifth foul. In his first 12 seasons, he had never fouled out of a game. Chamberlain did not foul out and led the Lakers to a 116–111 victory, but he broke his wrist in the overtime period.  The Lakers held a 3–1 series lead going into game 5 in Los Angeles. In game 5, Chamberlain played despite his injury. The score was tied at 53 in the first half, but the Lakers outscored the Knicks 61–47 in the second half to win the game and the NBA Championship, 114–100.

Notable trades

Final standings

By division

By conference

Notes
z, y – division champions
x – clinched playoff spot

Playoff bracket

Statistics leaders

NBA awards
Most Valuable Player: Kareem Abdul-Jabbar, Milwaukee Bucks
Rookie of the Year: Sidney Wicks, Portland Trail Blazers
Coach of the Year: Bill Sharman, Los Angeles Lakers

All-NBA First Team:
F – Spencer Haywood, Seattle SuperSonics
F – John Havlicek, Boston Celtics
C – Kareem Abdul-Jabbar, Milwaukee Bucks
G – Jerry West, Los Angeles Lakers
G – Walt Frazier, New York Knicks

All-NBA Second Team:
F – Billy Cunningham, Philadelphia 76ers
F – Bob Love, Chicago Bulls
C – Wilt Chamberlain, Los Angeles Lakers
G – Nate Archibald, Cincinnati Royals
G – Archie Clark, Baltimore Bullets

All-NBA Rookie Team:
Sidney Wicks, Portland Trail Blazers
Clifford Ray, Chicago Bulls
Austin Carr, Cleveland Cavaliers
Elmore Smith, Buffalo Braves
Phil Chenier, Baltimore Bullets

NBA All-Defensive First Team:
Dave DeBusschere, New York Knicks
John Havlicek, Boston Celtics
Wilt Chamberlain, Los Angeles Lakers
Jerry West, Los Angeles Lakers
Walt Frazier, New York Knicks (tie)
Jerry Sloan, Chicago Bulls (tie)

NBA All-Defensive Second Team:
Paul Silas, Phoenix Suns
Bob Love, Chicago Bulls
Nate Thurmond, Golden State Warriors
Norm Van Lier, Chicago Bulls
Don Chaney, Boston Celtics

Note: All information on this page were obtained on the History section on NBA.com or Basketball reference.com

See also
1972 NBA Finals
1972 NBA playoffs
1971–72 Los Angeles Lakers season
1971–72 ABA season

References